Moriah Jerusalem Development Corporation is an organization, established by the Municipality of Jerusalem in 1987. The main objective of Moriah is to develop the infrastructure in Jerusalem and perform public work for local government.

History and management
Moriah was founded in 1986 by Uzi Wechsler, former city treasurer of the Jerusalem Development Authority. It has worked closely with the Jerusalem Development Authority since the time of Teddy Kollek, who was mayor of Jerusalem and founder of the Jerusalem Foundation. Moriah promotes infrastructure development for the Jerusalem Development Authority, the Ministry of Transport and Road Safety, and the Ministry of Transport and Road Safety, and it has affiliated with these ministries. It includes around 10 companies to manage and execute the projects.

Projects
The company has completed more than 50 projects and it manages over 100 projects.

Jerusalem Light Rail 
Bridge of Strings
Jerusalem Arena
Teddy Stadium
Jerusalem Biblical Zoo, 
High-speed railway to Jerusalem
Jerusalem Road 21
Highway 1
Highway 50 
Jerusalem Road 16 
Jerusalem Road 20
 Exploiting Solar Energy - Installing solar energy on school rooftops and public buildings in order to have utilize clean & renewable energy. So far, 90 installations have been completed through several phrases. The project will be expanded in future, especially in 2014.

References

Organizations based in Jerusalem